Mont Ste. Marie is a privately owned ski resort 1 hour north of Ottawa in Lac-Sainte-Marie, Quebec, Canada. Between 1997 and 2002, Mont Ste. Marie was owned by Intrawest, a real estate development corporation, known for such places as Mont-Tremblant, Quebec, and Whistler Blackcomb, B.C.

Stats 

Vertical: 381 vertical meters
Number of Trails: 20
Skiable Acreage: 100
Total Lifts: 3 (Two High-Speed quads and 1 surface lift)
Lift Capacity per hour: 5,900
Snowmaking: snowmaking is possible with 200 state of the art snowguns (100% of skiable terrain is covered by snowmaking)
Total operating days for winter season: 125 (average)
Average annual snowfall: 300 cm

Real Estate 
Residence du Cheval Blanc
Private Homes throughout

See also 

Calabogie Peaks
Camp Fortune
Mount Pakenham

References

External links
 Official website

Tourist attractions in Outaouais